Purba Banglar Sarbahara Party (Proletarian Party of East Bengal) is a communist party in Bangladesh. The party played a role in the independence struggle of the country. In the early 1970s it engaged in armed struggle supporting the new Bangladeshi state. Since then its political fortunes have dwindled, having suffered from several waves of internal divisions. The group remains active, and still carries out attacks against its opponents.

Origins
The group emerged from the pro-China trend of the communist movement in erstwhile East Pakistan. In 1967, Siraj Sikder had formed the Mao Tse Tung Thought Research Centre in Dhaka. The centre was physically attacked by Jamaat-e-Islami cadres at several times. On January 8, 1968 the group formed the Purba Banglar Sramik Andalon ('Workers Movement of East Bengal'). The founding conference lasted, which was completed in a single day, was held in the residence of a jute mill worker in Dhaka. The conference was attended by 45 to 50 followers of the centre.

The line of this tendency differed clearly from other pro-Chinese groupings in East Pakistan at the time. Sikdar's faction saw Pakistan as a colonial power, and wanted to struggle for national liberation for East Bengal and the formation of a Democratic Republic of East Bengal. This stood in sharp contrast to official PRC foreign policy, which generally supported Pakistan against India. This line was also more radical than that of the mainstream Bengali nationalist movement. Sheikh Mujibur Rahman denounced the Sikdar faction as 'pro-Chinese provocateurs'.

The group also opposed American imperialism, Soviet social imperialism, Indian expansionism and feudalism.

In mid-1968 the movement began underground actions. Their first action was to capture a cyclostyle printing machine, with which the theoretical organ of the movement, Lal Jhanda, was printed. On January 8, 1970, the group hoisted the flag of East Bengal (the present national flag of Bangladesh) at Dhaka, Munshigonj and Mymensingh. On Karl Marx's birthday, May 6, 1970, the group threw bomb into the Pakistan Council office in Dhaka. In October the same year, the group attacked a number of buildings around East Pakistan with bombs, including the American Information Centre.

Liberation War

When the Liberation War began in 1971, the Sikder faction strove to establish national resistance cells. On April 30 they founded a paramilitary force of their own, the Purba Banglar Sashastra Deshapremik Bahini (Armed Patriotic Force of East Bengal), which initiated armed struggle against the Pakistani army. Notably, this grouping was one among the pro-China factions that took active part in the liberation war. 
 The official PRC line at the time was that East Bengal was part of Pakistan, and that Indian expansionism constituted the major threat to the region at large. However, the group did consider the mainstream nationalist movement as class enemies.

On June 3, 1971, Purba Bangla Sarbahara Party was constituted as a political party, at a meeting the Barisal district.

Post-independence
After Independence of Bangladesh, PBSP emerged as one of the main challengers of the new Awami League-government, which it considered as Indian puppets. The first party congress was held on January 14, 1972. Sikder was elected as the Chairman of the party. In April 1973 the Purba Banglar Jatiya Mukti Front, a coalition of 11 groups, was formed. Sikder became the president of the front. After the formation of the front, the party initiated a campaign of armed struggle against the Bangladeshi state.
The party had strong support amongst university circles. It published Lal Jhanda (Red Flag) and Sangbad Bulletine. Although an underground movement, it brought out publications of its Central Committee rather regularly and had a functioning propaganda work.

Death of Sikder

In December 1974, Siraj Sikder was captured in Halishahar, Chittagong by the state intelligence service. He was killed at night on January 2, 1975 near Savar Thana Bus Stand (Ganda) en route from Dhaka airport to a paramilitary camp at Savar. After the death of Sikder, the party was split into two. Later these two factions split further. The major faction was led by the second in command of Siraj Sikder, Md. Hamidul Hoque, who took over the reins of the party. The splinter group would break with Maoism and adopt the political line of Albanian Communists. That group would later take the name Communist Party of Bangladesh.

Party today
The current group that can be seen as the inheritor of the original PBSP is often referred to as the "PBSP (Central Committee)". The party remains an underground group, and has a programme of armed revolution. It is led by Anwarul Kabir ('Abdur Rouf'). Its area of activities includes the Sirajganj, Bogra, Pabna, Rajshahi and Khulna districts. The party is affiliated to the Revolutionary Internationalist Movement and CCOMPOSA.

In 2001 a group broke away from PBSP(CC) and formed the Purba Banglar Sarbahara Party (Maoist Bolshevik Reorganisation Movement).

In May 2013 six PBSP cadres were arrested along with pipe guns and homemade rifles.

See also
 Coordination Committee of Maoist Parties and Organisations of South Asia

Notes

External links
 Sarbahara - Siraj Sikder works in English

Communist militant groups
Communist parties in Bangladesh
Coordination Committee of Maoist Parties and Organisations of South Asia
Revolutionary Internationalist Movement
Maoist parties
Paramilitary organisations based in Bangladesh
Maoist organisations in Bangladesh
Organizations based in Asia designated as terrorist
Terrorism in Bangladesh